Wolf Call is a 1939 American Western film directed by George Waggner and starring John Carroll, Movita and George Lynn. A New York playboy is sent by his father to investigate his radium mine in Canada.

Cast
 John Carroll as Michael 'Mike' Vance
 Movita as Towana
 George Lynn as Father Devlin 
 Guy Usher as Michael Vance, Sr.
 Holmes Herbert as J.L. Winton
 Polly Ann Young as Natalie
 George Cleveland as Dr. MacTavish
 John Kelly as Bull Nelson
 Wheeler Oakman as Carson
 John Sheehan as Grogan
 Charles Irwin as Mounted Police Sergeant
 Reed Howes as Tom - Henchman 
 Murdock MacQuarrie as Miner
 Carl Mathews as Miner 
 George Morrell as Stricken Miner
 Pat O'Malley as RCMP Sergeant 
 Tex Phelps as Miner 
 Roger Williams as Tom Blake

References

Bibliography
 Pitts, Michael R. Western Movies: A Guide to 5,105 Feature Films. McFarland, 2012.

External links
 

1939 films
1939 adventure films
1939 Western (genre) films
American adventure films
American Western (genre) films
Films directed by George Waggner
American black-and-white films
Monogram Pictures films
Films set in New York City
Northern (genre) films
Films based on works by Jack London
1930s English-language films
1930s American films